James Patrick Thomas Latham (born 8 October 1975) is an English cricketer.  Latham is a right-handed batsman who bowls right-arm medium pace.  He was born in Hexham, Northumberland.

Latham made his debut for Cambridgeshire in the 1997 Minor Counties Championship against Bedfordshire.  Latham played Minor counties cricket for Cambridgeshire from 1997 to 2002, which included 23 Minor Counties Championship matches and 4 MCCA Knockout Trophy matches.  In 1999, he made his only List A appearance against Kent in the NatWest Trophy.  In this match he scored 12 runs before being dismissed by Dean Headley.  With the ball he bowled 4 wicket-less overs.

Latham has previously represented the Durham Second XI and the Somerset Second XI in Second XI cricket.  His father, Mike Latham, played first-class cricket for Somerset and List A cricket for Northumberland.

References

External links
Patrick Latham at ESPNcricinfo
Patrick Latham at CricketArchive

1975 births
Living people
Sportspeople from Hexham
Cricketers from Northumberland
English cricketers
Cambridgeshire cricketers